Fremont County School District #6 is a public school district based in , Wyoming, United States.

Geography
Fremont County School District #6 serves northwestern and north central Fremont County, including the following communities:

Incorporated places
Town of 
Census-designated places (Note: All census-designated places are unincorporated.)
Crowheart
Johnstown (partial)
Unincorporated places
Kinnear
Morton

Schools
Wind River Middle/High School (Grades 6–12)
Crowheart Elementary School (Grades K-3)
Wind River Elementary School (Grades K-5)

Student demographics
The following figures are as of October 1, 2009.

Total District Enrollment: 396
Student enrollment by gender
Male: 201 (50.76%)
Female: 195 (49.24%)
Student enrollment by ethnicity
American Indian or Alaska Native: 79 (19.95%)
Hispanic or Latino: 11 (2.78%)
Native Hawaiian or Other Pacific Islander: 4 (1.01%)
Two or More Races: 22 (5.56%)
White: 280 (70.71%)

See also
List of school districts in Wyoming

References

External links
Fremont County School District #6 – official site.

Education in Fremont County, Wyoming
School districts in Wyoming